Keerthiraj is an Indian actor in the Kannada film industry. Some of the notable films of Keerthiraj as an actor include Gajanura Gandu (1996), Bhanda Nanna Ganda (1992), and S. P. Bhargavi (1991).

Career
Keerthiraj has been part of more than 55 Kannada feature films.

Selected filmography
Keerthiraj has appeared in the following Kannada films.

 Mumtaz (movie) 
 Ranna (2015)
 Gharshane (2014)
 Godfather (2012)
 Super Nanna Maga (1992) 	
 Krishna Nee Kunidaga (1989)
 Brahma Vishnu Maheshwara (1988)

See also

List of people from Karnataka
Cinema of Karnataka
List of Indian film actors
Cinema of India

References

Living people
Male actors in Kannada cinema
Indian male film actors
Male actors from Karnataka
20th-century Indian male actors
21st-century Indian male actors
Year of birth missing (living people)
Place of birth missing (living people)